Otaegi may refer to:

People 
 Arnaldo Otegi (born 1958), Spanish Basque politician
 Joxe Azurmendi Otaegi (born 1941), Basque writer, philosopher, essayist and poet
 Juan Domínguez Otaegui (born 1983), Spanish retired footballer
 Leire Otaegi (born 1977), Spanish curler
 Oihane Otaegi (born 1977), Spanish curler